Paul Neely Moore (January 23, 1918 – May 7, 1975) was an American football player.

A native of Okeechobee, Florida, Moore attended York High School and Presbyterian College, both in South Carolina.  For three years, he played at the blocking-halfback position for the Presbyterian Blue Hose football team.

Presbyterian coach Walter A. Johnson recommended that Detroit Lions coach Potsy Clark sign Moore. Clark invited Moore for a tryout, and Moore impressed. He played for two seasons as a blocking back and linebacker for the Lions. He appeared in 15 games during the 1940 and 1941 seasons.

References

1918 births
1975 deaths
People from Okeechobee, Florida
American football linebackers
Presbyterian Blue Hose football players
Detroit Lions players
Players of American football from Florida